Coldwaltham is a village and civil parish in the Horsham District of West Sussex, England. It is divided in two by the A29 road and lies 2.4 miles (3.9 km) southwest of Pulborough which has both a railway station on the Arun Valley Line and a bus connection to Worthing. It is around a 30-minute drive from Gatwick Airport. The 2011 Census population included the village of Hardham  plus hamlet of Watersfield.

The 13th century Anglican parish church is dedicated to Saint Giles; a rare 11th century gravestone and a simple Saxon font are present on the site. A yew tree near the north west corner is among the oldest in England, believed to be over 3000 years old. There is one pub, the Labouring Man. Sandham Hall is used for village events.

The Church of England primary school shares a headteacher with Amberley School.

References

External links 

Horsham District
Villages in West Sussex